Omaha Country Club is a private country club in Omaha, Nebraska, located in the northern area of the city.

Established in 1899 in the Country Club Historic District, it selected its present site in 1925. The golf course opened in 1927 and was renovated in 1951 by Perry Maxwell. The club  hosted the U.S. Senior Open in 2013, won by Kenny Perry and 2021, won by Jim Furyk.

References

External links

2013 U.S. Senior Open: official site
Omaha.com: 2013 U.S. Senior Open

Golf in Nebraska
Sports venues in Omaha, Nebraska